Qaleh Baha (also Romanized as Qal‘eh Baha’; also known as Qal‘eh Bahār-e Pā'īn) is a village in Maviz Rural District, in the Central District of Shahriar County, Tehran Province, Iran. At the 2006 census, its population was 651, in 171 families.

References 

Populated places in Shahriar County